Janet Coleman FRHistS (born 1945, New York City) is a British academic and historian of political theory.

She is currently the Professor of Ancient and Medieval Political Thought at the London School of Economics. She was the first woman to receive a chair in the LSE government department. Her research interests include ancient Greek and Roman political thought, medieval philosophy, and theories of citizenship and the state.

Coleman studied at L'Ecole Pratique des Hautes Etudes in Paris and received her Ph.D. degree from Yale University. She has held teaching appointments in politics at Exeter University and on the History Faculty of the University of Cambridge.

In 1980 she co-founded (with Iain Hampsher-Monk) the academic journal History of Political Thought, which she continues to co-edit. She is a Fellow of the Royal Historical Society.

Coleman has taught at LSE since 1989, where from 2001 to 2004 she held a  Leverhulme Major Research Fellowship. Her lectures in the introductory government course at the LSE are known for her attempts to "'be' political philosophers from the ancient Greeks to Machiavelli." Coleman plans to retire in 2010. She has been offered a Global Distinguished Professorship at New York University.

Coleman resides in Cambridge.

Select bibliography 

English Literature in History 1350-1400: Medieval Readers and Writers, 1981
Against the State: Studies in Sedition and Rebellion, 1990
Ancient and Medieval Memories: Studies in the Reconstruction of the Past, 1992
The Individual in Political Theory and Practice, 1996
Scholastics, Enlightenments and Philosophic Radicals: Essays in Honour of J. H. Burns (ed.), 1999 
A History of Political Thought, from Ancient Greece to Early Christianity, 2000
A History of Political Thought, from the Middle Ages to the Renaissance, 2000

References

External links 
Coleman's LSE profile

1945 births
Living people
Academics of the London School of Economics
British political philosophers
Fellows of the Royal Historical Society
British women historians
Political science journal editors